Mihajlo Mihajlovski is the current chairman of RK Vardar. In 2008, he was re-elected as the commissioner of the Macedonian Handball Federation.

References

Living people
Year of birth missing (living people)